Gary K. Johnson (September 14, 1939August 8, 2008) was an American educator and Democratic politician.  He served 14 years in the Wisconsin State Assembly, representing southern Rock County, and was majority leader from 1980 until 1985.  After leaving the Assembly, he worked for a time as Assistant Superintendent in the Wisconsin Department of Public Instruction.

Early life and career
Born in Grand Forks, North Dakota, he moved to Beloit, Wisconsin, with his family as a child.  He graduated from Beloit Memorial High School and went on to earn his bachelor's degree from Beloit College in 1963.  Afterwards, he went back to Beloit Memorial High School as a social studies teacher.  Through his work as an educator, he became involved in the Beloit Education Association, the local branch of the Wisconsin Education Association labor union, and would become president of the local organization.

Public career
In 1970, Johnson was elected to the Wisconsin State Assembly in Rock County's 3rd district, defeating incumbent Republican George B. Belting.  He was subsequently reelected 7 times, serving until 1985.

In 1980, Democratic Assembly Majority Leader James W. Wahner announced he would resign from the Assembly in order to accept an appointment in the federal government.  Johnson, considered a moderate, was elected the new majority leader on the 2nd ballot, defeating Thomas A. Loftus (of the liberal wing) and Thomas A. Hauke (conservative).  He remained majority leader until leaving the Assembly in 1985.

After leaving the Assembly, he worked briefly as a lobbyist for Wisconsin Bell, but, in 1986, accepted appointment as Assistant Superintendent in the Wisconsin Department of Public Instruction, under Superintendent Herbert J. Grover.  He left government service again in 1990, and worked as a lobbyist until retiring in 1996.

Personal life
Johnson and his wife, Heather, had three children together.  He died at his home in Madison, Wisconsin, in August 2008.

References

External links
 Johnson, Gary K. 1939 at Wisconsin Historical Society

|-

|-

|-

1939 births
2008 deaths
Politicians from Beloit, Wisconsin
Politicians from Grand Forks, North Dakota
Members of the Wisconsin State Assembly
Beloit College alumni
20th-century American politicians